Dowlatabad (also Romanized as Dowlatābād and Daulatābād) is a village in Jafarabad Rural District, Jafarabad District, Qom County, Qom Province, Iran. At the 2006 census, its population was 305, in 76 families.

References 

Populated places in Qom Province